Capcom's MVP Football is a sports game for the Super Nintendo Entertainment System which simulates the American football game of the NFL, released in North America.

Summary
There are four different game modes:
 Custom mode allows exhibition-type games to be played and for all the components of the game to be customized. Players can either control the action on the field or just be a coach and call all the plays.
 A tournament mode permits players to take his team through the playoff bracket and into the Super Bowl.
 MVP mode requires players to change history as he changes the outcome of historical NFL games.
 Demo mode allows the players to watch the AI play against itself.

Other features of the game include:
 An instant replay after the end of every important play and the end of each half provides a television-like angle to the gameplay on field.
 Game statistics show deficient stats in red numerals.

References

1993 video games
Capcom games
National Football League video games
North America-exclusive video games
Super Nintendo Entertainment System games
Super Nintendo Entertainment System-only games
Video games scored by Ed Bogas
Video games developed in the United States
Multiplayer and single-player video games